The Highland Community College Scotties are the sports teams of Highland Community College located in Highland, Kansas, United States. They participate in the National Junior College Athletic Association and in the Kansas Jayhawk Community College Conference.

Sports

Men's sports
Baseball
Basketball
Cross country
Football
Track & field

Women's sports
Basketball
Cross country
Softball
Spirit Squad
Track & field
Volleyball
Soccer

Men's and Women's sports
E-Sports

Facilities
Highland Community College has four athletics facilities.
 Ben Allen Fieldhouse – home of the men's and women's basketball teams, and volleyball team
 Porter Family Stadium – home of the Scotties football team
 Scotties Baseball Field – home of the Scotties baseball team
 Scotties Softball Field – home of the Lady Scotties softball team

References

External links
 

Sports teams in Kansas